Belle Tire is an American tire, wheel and automotive service retailer headquartered in Allen Park, Michigan. It was founded in 1922, after its first location was opened in Detroit, Michigan, by Sam Waze. It currently operates 130+ locations in Michigan, Indiana, Ohio and Illinois.

History 
In the 1960s, Don Barnes Sr., a Kelly Tire salesman who had been a supplier to Belle Tire, partnered with Waze. The partnership proved to be successful, with the company opening several other locations in the Metro Detroit area. In the 1980s, the Barnes family bought Waze's remaining shares and continued expansion of the business through acquisitions of American Tire, Capital Tire, Delta Tire, and Great Lakes Tire. The company grew significantly in the 1990s via the acquisition of the Tireman and Metro 25 chains in the 1990s, and Sears' NTB locations in Michigan in the early 2000s.

Since the mid-2000s Belle Tire has continued its expansion throughout Michigan, building new stores in the Metro Detroit, Flint, Grand Rapids, Kalamazoo, and Lansing areas.

In 2013, the company launched an initiative to redesign its retail stores to make them more customer-friendly.

In 2015, the company expanded its retail footprint to Indiana with four locations: Mishawaka, Elkhart, and two in South Bend. This expansion marked an important moment in the company's more than 90-year history in the tire business. It was the company's first move into new territory since expanding from Michigan to northern Ohio more than 30 years ago. In 2015, Don Barnes III was named president.

References

External links
 Official website
 Crain's List Private 200

American companies established in 1922
Retail companies established in 1922
Companies based in Wayne County, Michigan
Automotive part retailers of the United States
Privately held companies based in Michigan